John Angus McMillan (June 11, 1874 – December 23, 1922) was an Ontario merchant and political figure. He represented Glengarry in the Legislative Assembly of Ontario from 1905 to 1908 and in the House of Commons of Canada from 1908 to 1917 as a Liberal member.

He was born in Alexandria, Ontario, the son of Duncan McMillan, and grew up there. McMillan served on the town council for Alexandria. He was an agent for a furniture and appliance manufacturer. In 1906, he married Flora McDonald.

References

External links 

Stormont, Dundas and Glengarry : a history, 1784-1945, JG Harkness (1946)

1874 births
1922 deaths
Ontario Liberal Party MPPs
Liberal Party of Canada MPs
Members of the House of Commons of Canada from Ontario
People from the United Counties of Stormont, Dundas and Glengarry